FC Kolos Nizhnechuyskoye is a Kyrgyzstani football club based in village Nizhnechuyskoye, Chuy Region, Kyrgyzstan that played in the top division in Kyrgyzstan, the Kyrgyzstan League.

History 
19??: Founded as FC Kolos Nizhnechuyskoye.

Achievements 
Kyrgyzstan League:
8th place: 1995 (Promotion/relegation play Off: Northern Zone)

Kyrgyzstan Cup:
1/4 finals: 1996

Current squad

External links 
Profile at footballfacts.ru

Football clubs in Kyrgyzstan